Body Riddle is the third studio album by English electronic musician Chris Clark and the first one under the mononym Clark. It was released on 2 October 2006 by Warp.

The music video for the song "Ted" was selected by Pitchfork as one of the top music videos of 2007. "Vengeance Drools" was later used in the 2009 short film Cut, promoting the charitable organisation Women's Aid. "Ted" was used as the theme song to the 2022 Channel 4 comedy series I Hate You.

Critical reception

Ryan Dombal of Pitchfork wrote that Clark "infuses sonic streaks of contemporaries like Four Tet, Prefuse 73, and DJ Shadow into his repertoire, along with his usual Aphex and Boards of Canada tics, and in the process crafts his best album to date". In 2017, Pitchfork ranked Body Riddle at number 17 on its list of "The 50 Best IDM Albums of All Time".

Track listing

Personnel
Credits adapted from the liner notes of Body Riddle.

Musicians
 Christopher Clark – performance, arrangements
 Richard Roberts – vocal assistance 
 Stephen Wilkinson – vocal assistance

Technical personnel
 Christopher Clark – production
 Naweed – mastering

References

2006 albums
Clark (musician) albums
Warp (record label) albums